The 2001 Nova Supersports Cup was an association football friendly tournament competition hosted by Greek premium sports network Nova Sports in 2001, held in Athens.

The tournament occurred on 3 August 2001 with the participation of Greek Alpha Ethniki club AEK Athens, Sevilla from the La Liga and Bologna from the Serie A, which eventually won the tournament.

Teams
The teams who accepted the invitations are:

  AEK Athens – Alpha Ethniki (host)
  Sevilla – La Liga
  Bologna – Serie A

Venue

All the games were played at the Nikos Goumas Stadium a 27,729 seat multi-use venue, home ground of hosts AEK Athens. The ground has been demolished in June 2003.

Games

Table

Results

Scorers

References

Bibliography 
 Συλλογικό έργο (2014). 90 ΧΡΟΝΙΑ, Η ΙΣΤΟΡΙΑ ΤΗΣ ΑΕΚ . Αθήνα, Ελλάδα: Εκδοτικός Οίκος Α. Α. Λιβάνη. .
 Παναγιωτακόπουλος, Παναγιώτης (2021). 1963-2021 ΤΟ ΤΑΞΙΔΙ ΣΥΝΕΧΙΖΕΤΑΙ . Αθήνα, Ελλάδα: .
 Παναγιωτακόπουλος, Παναγιώτης (2022). 1979-2003 ΤΟ ΤΑΞΙΔΙ ΣΥΝΕΧΙΖΕΤΑΙ...Νο2 . Αθήνα, Ελλάδα: .

External links
 Supersport Tournament (Athinai) 1999-2001
 AEK Athens Fixtures of period 2001-2002

2001 establishments in Greece